The 2004 United States House of Representatives elections in New York took place on November 2, 2004. One seat changed parties; in the 27th district Democrat Brian Higgins was elected to replace Republican Jack Quinn.

Composition

District 1

Candidates
Tim Bishop, incumbent U.S. Representative
William M. Manger Jr., former Southampton trustee

Endorsements

Results

District 2

Candidates
Steve Israel, incumbent U.S. Representative
Richard Hoffman, Islip Deputy Attorney

Endorsements

Results

District 3

Candidates
Peter T. King, incumbent U.S. Representative
Blair Mathies, attorney

Results

District 4

Candidates
Carolyn McCarthy (Democratic), incumbent U.S. Representative
James Garner (Republican), Mayor of Hempstead Village

Endorsements

Results

District 5

Candidates
Gary Ackerman, incumbent U.S. Representative
Stephen Graves, businessman
Gonzalo Policarpio, retired immigration inspector

Results

District 6

Candidates
Greg Meeks (Democratic), incumbent U.S. Representative

Results

District 7

Candidates
Joe Crowley, incumbent U.S. Representative
Joseph Cinquemani, attorney

Results

District 8

Candidates
Jerry Nadler, incumbent U.S. Representative
Peter Hort, non-profit executive

Results

District 9

Candidates
Anthony Weiner (Democratic), incumbent U.S. Representative
Gerard Cronin (Republican), educator and candidate for Governor of New York in 2002

Results

District 10

Candidates
Edolphus Towns (Democratic), incumbent U.S. Representative
Harvey R. Clarke (Republican), adjunct professor of Political Science at Pace University
Mariana Blume (Conservative), activist and former model

Results

District 11

Candidates
Major Owens (Democratic), incumbent U.S. Representative
Lorraine Stevens (Independence), counselor and perennial candidate
Sol Lieberman (Conservative), attorney

Results

District 29

Candidates
Randy Kuhl (Republican), state senator
Samara Barend (Democratic), non-profit executive
Mark Assini (Conservative), Monroe County legislator
John Ciampoli (Independence), attorney

Results

Results

Notes

References

New York
2004
2004 New York (state) elections